Daniel Brett Weiss (born April 23, 1971) is an American television writer, director, and producer. Along with his collaborator David Benioff, he is best-known for co-creating Game of Thrones (2011–2019), the HBO adaptation of George R. R. Martin's series of books A Song of Ice and Fire.

Early life 
Weiss was born and raised in Chicago, Illinois. His family is Jewish, with ancestral roots in Germany. He graduated from Wesleyan University and earned a Master of Philosophy in Irish literature from Trinity College Dublin, where he wrote his thesis on James Joyce's Finnegans Wake,  "Understanding the (Net) Wake." He later earned a Master of Fine Arts in creative writing from the Iowa Writers' Workshop.

Career
Weiss worked as personal assistant on films such as The Viking Sagas for New Line Cinema. For a brief period, he also worked as a personal assistant for musician Glenn Frey. Weiss went to Dublin in 1995 to study Anglo-Irish literature and met David Benioff, the screenwriter of Troy. Three years later, around 1998, they met again in Santa Monica, California.

Weiss and Benioff co-wrote a screenplay for a film titled The Headmaster, but it was never made. In 2003, they were hired to collaborate on a new script of Orson Scott Card's book Ender's Game, in consultation with the then-designated director Wolfgang Petersen. It was not used.

Weiss's 2003 debut novel, Lucky Wander Boy, is themed around video games. In 2006, he said he had written a second novel that "needs a second draft". The same year, Weiss completed a screenplay for a film adaptation of the video game series Halo, based on a script by Alex Garland, but director Neill Blomkamp declared the project dead in late 2007.

Weiss also worked on a script for a prequel to I Am Legend, but in May 2011, director Francis Lawrence said that he did not think the prequel would ever happen.

Weiss collaborated with Benioff on the HBO television series Game of Thrones, based on George R. R. Martin's book series A Song of Ice and Fire. Benioff and Weiss also directed three episodes together. For the first two, they flipped a coin to decide who would get the credit on the show. Weiss received directing credit for "Two Swords", Season 4 episode 1, while Benioff was credited for "Walk of Punishment", Season 3 episode 3. Benioff and Weiss were both credited for co-directing the series finale, "The Iron Throne".

On July 19, 2017, Weiss announced that he and Benioff were going to begin production on another HBO series, Confederate, after the final season of Game of Thrones. Weiss and Benioff said, "We have discussed Confederate for years, originally as a concept for a feature film, but our experience on Thrones has convinced us that no one provides a bigger, better storytelling canvas than HBO." In January 2020, HBO President Casey Bloys confirmed that the project had been officially canceled.

On February 6, 2018, Disney announced that Weiss and Benioff would write and produce a new series of Star Wars films after the last season of Game of Thrones ended in 2019. Toward the end of the last season, a petition to HBO was started on Change.org. It described showrunners Benioff and Weiss as "woefully incompetent writers" and demanded "competent writers" to remake the eighth season of Game of Thrones in a manner "that makes sense". The petition eventually amassed over 1.5 million signatures. In the Chicago Sun Times, Richard Roeper wrote that the backlash to the eighth season was so great that he doubted he had "ever seen the level of fan (and to a lesser degree, critical) vitriol leveled at" Game of Thrones.

In early 2019, Weiss and Benioff entered into an exclusive $200 million deal with Netflix to produce several films and television shows exclusively for it. In late October 2019, it was reported that Weiss and Benioff had exited their deal with Disney due to their commitments to Netflix.

Weiss and Benioff's first project on Netflix were as directors of Leslie Jones's stand-up comedy special Time Machine.

In September 2020, it was announced that Weiss, Benioff and Alexander Woo would write and executive produce a Netflix series based on The Three-Body Problem trilogy in a four-part series.

Personal life
Weiss and his wife, Andrea Troyer, have two children.

Bibliography

Author

Filmography
Film

Television

Awards and nominations

See also

 List of awards and nominations received by Game of Thrones

References

External links 

 

1971 births
21st-century American Jews
21st-century American male writers
21st-century American novelists
21st-century American screenwriters
Alumni of Trinity College Dublin
American male novelists
American male screenwriters
American male television writers
American people of German-Jewish descent
American television directors
American television writers
Hugo Award-winning writers
Iowa Writers' Workshop alumni
Jewish American screenwriters
Living people
Novelists from Illinois
Primetime Emmy Award winners
Screenwriters from Illinois
Showrunners
Television producers from Illinois
Wesleyan University alumni
Writers from Chicago